Bani Awf is a sub-district located in Al Madan District, 'Amran Governorate, Yemen. Bani Awf had a population of 5968 according to the 2004 census.

References 

Sub-districts in Al Madan District